Jellyfish Pictures is a British VFX company specializing in the creation of digital visual effects and animation.

History 
The studio was founded in 2001 by Philip Dobree and Will Rockall, with a team of three artists and one producer. In 2003 they moved to their first studio in Soho, Central London in Poland Street. In 2005, they started their first long form TV series The Story of One with Monty Python's Terry Jones. In 2007 they worked on a landmark BBC series "Fight For Life" winning multiple industry awards, including a BAFTA, RTS and VES award for outstanding visual effects. They continued to expand and grow further, in 2011 working on the long form CGi series "Planet Dinosaur" for BBC and Discovery Channel, delivering 180 mins of primetime television, recreating a new world for viewers of the Jurassic period and bringing to life the latest discoveries in palaeontology (the series was nominated for several VFX awards). In 2012 the company was nominated for and won several awards for their work on "Inside the Human Body" including an EMMY and a further VES award. Between 2015 and 2018 the company worked on three Star Wars films for Lucas films. Rogue One, A Star Wars Story, Star Wars: The Last Jedi, and Solo: A Star Wars Story. In 2017, Jellyfish Pictures opens Europe’s first wholly "virtual" VFX and animation studio at The Oval, South London, with their first 'virtually' produced project Bitz and Bob, bringing the number of people at Jellyfish up to 200. They also expanded their offering, creating Jellyfish Originals producing various original shows like Ivy and the Inklings and Hughman. One year later, Jellyfish also announced their collab with Jollywise to produce an animated series call Stan & Gran.

In 2020, a studio division in Sheffield was opened up and overseen by animation director Kevin Spruce, with an animated feature film in production for DreamWorks Animation,Spirit Untamed. Due to the COVID pandemic however, workers had to animate at home following this experience. In 2019, they made the animation for DreamWorks' How to Train Your Dragon: Homecoming and won an Annie award for Best Animated Special Production and nominated for Outstanding Achievement for Animated Effects in an Animated Television/Broadcast Production and Outstanding Achievement for Character Animation in an Animated Television / Broadcast Production.

In 2021, Jellyfish Pictures collaborated further on two DreamWorks films while their main production was Spirit Untamed, they were also in charge of Production Assist support for The Boss Baby: Family Business and the additional Production Assist support on The Bad Guys, while the animation was only produced from DWA Glendale. In 2022, Jellyfish Pictures has joined Key Capital Partners over a minority investment, meaning it will expedite the global scaling of Jellyfish's VFX and animation teams, and advance the development and production of its original kids and family content through Jellyfish Originals. David Patton joins Jellyfish Pictures as Chief Executive Officer in December 2022 while Mark Warburg also joins in as Chief Operating Officer. In 2022 they worked on several high profile films and projects for Netflix, including a feature film in the Dahl franchise and a major episodic animated series partly developed inhouse at Jellyfish, as well as collaborating on further films for DreamWorks Animation. The company worked on a large slate of episodic VFX drama in 2021/2 including The Book of Bobba Fett for Lucas Film and Stranger Things 4 for Netflix. The company continues to expand including establishing a new division in Mumbai, India in 2023, further using their technology and technical pipeline advances which allow the company to seamlessly work with artists in global locations. They were early adopters of this capability and continue to advance techniques and ways of working to successfully onboard artists.

Production

TV series

Films

Live Action VFX

Animation

Accolades

Annie Awards

References

External links
 

2001 establishments in England
British companies established in 2001
Mass media companies established in 2001
Television production companies of the United Kingdom
Film production companies of the United Kingdom
British animation studios